Eva-Marie Liffner (born 1957 in Gothenburg) is a Swedish author. Her work has been awarded the Gothenburg Book Fair Award for best first-time novelist, Swedish Academy of Crime Writers' First Book Award, The Poloni Prize, and The Flint Axe.

Works 

 Camera 2001
 Imago 2003
 Drömmaren och sorgen 2006 (no English translation)

References

External links 
Agency website

1957 births
Living people
Swedish women writers
Place of birth missing (living people)